During the 2018 Winter Paralympics Parade of Nations at the 2018 Winter Paralympics opening ceremony, beginning at 20:00 KST (UTC+9) on 9 March 2018, athletes bearing the flags of their respective nations led their national delegations as they paraded into the Pyeongchang Olympic Stadium in the host city of Pyeongchang, South Korea.

Background
All teams entered in alphabetical order based on the names of countries in the Korean language, except host nation South Korea, marched last. The collation method used is based on the names as written in Hangul, the Korean alphabet. The names of the nations were announced English and Korean, the official languages of the Paralympic movement and the host nation, in accordance with traditional and International Paralympic Committee (IPC) guidelines.

Whilst most countries entered under their short names, a few entered under more formal or alternative names, sometimes due to political or naming disputes. North Korean and South Korean teams marched on their own, after the leaders of both Koreas failed to arrange for both teams to march together in the opening ceremony. After a Russian state-sponsored doping program was exposed following the 2014 Winter Paralympics, the Russian Paralympic Committee was suspended, and selected athletes were allowed to compete neutrally under the IOC designation of "Neutral Paralympic Athletes" (패럴림픽 중립 선수), under 중. In addition, the United States, Iran, North Korea, China and South Korea all entered under their formal names, respectively the "United States of America", "Islamic Republic of Iran", "Democratic People's Republic of Korea", "People's Republic of China" and "Republic of Korea".

A record of 49 nations entered the stadium with a combined total of 569 athletes. Three nations made their Winter Paralympic debut, namely Georgia, North Korea and Tajikistan.

List
Below is a list of parading countries and their announced flag bearer, in the same order as the parade. This is sortable by country name, flag bearer's name and flag bearer's sport. Names are given in the form officially designated by the IPC.

References

Parade of Nations
Lists of Paralympic flag bearers
Parades in South Korea